Operation Lancaster was a U.S. Marine Corps operation that took place in northern Quảng Trị Province from November 1967 to January 20, 1968.

Background
In November 1967, the Kingfisher Tactical Area of Operations (TAOR) was split in two creating the Lancaster TAOR and the Kentucky TAOR. The new Lancaster TAOR bordered the Vietnamese Demilitarized Zone (DMZ) to the north, the Scotland TAOR to the west and the Kentucky and Operationa Osceola to the east and contained the Marines bases of Camp Carroll, The Rockpile and Ca Lu Combat Base and was under the control of COL Joseph Lo Prete's 3rd Marine Regiment. Despite the closure of Route 9 by the People's Army of Vietnam (PAVN) west of Ca Lu, it remained the obvious route for any attempt to relieve the Khe Sanh Combat Base. The terrain in the Lancaster TAOR consisted of rolling hills climbing up to jungle-covered mountains.

Operation
The Marines task was to prevent PAVN infiltration from across the DMZ and from the west and to provide artillery and logistical support to the Marines at Khe Sanh.

Aftermath
Operation Lancaster concluded on 20 January 1968, PAVN losses were 46 killed for the loss of 22 Marines killed and 140 wounded. The operation was immediately continued as Operation Lancaster II in the same tactical area of operations.

References

1967 in Vietnam
1968 in Vietnam
Battles involving the United States
Battles involving Vietnam
Battles and operations of the Vietnam War in 1967
Battles and operations of the Vietnam War in 1968
Battles and operations of the Vietnam War
United States Marine Corps in the Vietnam War
History of Quảng Trị province